EarnIn is a financial services company that provides earned wage access services. Founded as Activehours in 2013, the app launched in May 2014. The company's business model, which is based on users paying voluntary "tips" to withdraw earned wages ahead of time, has been compared to payday lending services. It expanded its services in 2019 to include negotiating with doctors and hospitals to lower its users' medical bills.  In 2020, EarnIn acquired and implemented a new savings feature, Tip Yourself.

History 
The company was founded by Ram Palaniappan in 2013.

The company raised $4.1 million in 2014. At the time, some questioned whether the business model was viable since tipping was voluntary. The company partnered with Uber and Sears to allow its drivers to cash out after a shift.

By 2017, the company had raised $65 million in funding. And in December 2018, it raised an additional $125 million. It rebranded from Activehours to Earnin in November 2017.

In April 2019, the New York State Department of Financial Services investigated whether the company's "tipping" system skirted New York State lending laws regulating payday lending. An article in the New York Post said that members who do not leave tips may have their monthly maximum restricted, which may trigger interest rate disclosure laws. New York State subpoenaed information from the company, including a calculation of annual percentage rates if tips were measured as fees or interest. In 2019, there were also consumer complaints about glitches sometimes resulting in delays in fund transfers. On March 25, 2021, a federal court granted final approval for the class action settlement in Perks v. Activehours, Inc. (d/b/a EarnIn).

In May 2019, the company began offering its users a service to negotiate for a reduction in outstanding doctor or hospital bills. The company will also negotiate installment payments for outstanding medical bills if it can.The service is offered without a fee and members are asked to leave a voluntary tip for good service.

In 2019, EarnIn acquired Chicago-based company, Tip Yourself. In May 2020, EarnIn integrated the service into their own app. Tip Yourself is a tool that provides members with "Tip Jars" that they can set up for specific savings goals such as “a trip, home improvement projects or a rainy day fund.” 

In April 2020, during the COVID-19 pandemic, the company created a new feature giving workers access to their earned wages while remote working.

In January 2023, the company rebranded from Earnin to EarnIn. This rebrand included not only a name change but also a complete design and UI refresh, reimagining what EarnIn could be for its customers.

Services 
EarnIn’s main service, Cash Out, allows users to access earned wages which they have not yet been paid. The company also allows users to connect their app to a debit card, as well as a savings tool. EarnIn also offers Health Aid, a service that looks for lower payment options on medical bills.

Users asked to leave a "voluntary tip" for each transaction. However, users who do not tip may have monthly maximum restricted, and the company was investigated by the New York State Department of Financial Services for possibly breaking the state's payday lender laws. The app suggests multiple tip levels for every transaction. Tips are capped at about 15% of the daily maximum. After a member's scheduled wages are deposited in their bank account by their employer, the company automatically withdraws the wages and the tip.

References

Financial services companies based in California
Financial services companies established in 2012
Financial software companies
Earned Wage Access